Matsakabanja is a rural municipality in Madagascar. It belongs to the district of Mitsinjo, which is a part of Boeny Region. The population of the commune was estimated to be approximately 18,000 in 2001 commune census.

Matsakabanja is served by a local airport and riverine harbour. In addition to primary schooling the town offers secondary education at both junior and senior levels. Farming and raising livestock provides employment for 24% and 24% of the working population.  The most important crop is sugarcane, while other important products are maize, cassava and rice. Industry and services provide employment for 30% and 2% of the population, respectively. Additionally fishing employs 20% of the population.

Industry
The sugar mill of Namakia.

References

Populated places in Boeny